Richard Genzer (born 20 December 1966) is a Czech actor, dancer, singer, TV host and comedian.

He was born in Prague. His father wanted him to be an association football player, however, he attended and graduated from the Dance Conservatory in Prague, where he met and befriended his later colleague, Michal Suchánek.

Television and film career
After his studies he started working as a dancer in the group UNO, and subsequently began to appear in musicals. The most successful were Krysař (Pied Piper), West Side Story and Dracula. In 2000, along with Michal Suchánek, Josef Carda and Veronika Žilková, he performed on TV Nova's show Tele Tele.
He continued to work with Michal Suchánek on the show MR. GS.

He appeared in several films, including Kameňák 2's third sequel, Sněženky a machři po 25 letech (Snowdrops and Aces after 25 years) and Láska za milion (Love in a million).

Currently, he appears on TV Prima creating the improvisational show Partička (Bunch) together with Michal Suchánek, Ondřej Sokol and Igor Chmela.

Personal life
He was married to singer Linda Finková, with whom he has a daughter and a son.

Filmography

Films 
 2004 - Kameňák 2
 2005 - Kameňák 3
 2008 - Sněženky a machři po 25 letech
 2009 - Láska za milion
 2016 - Pat a Mat ve filmu

Television films 
 1990 - Takmer ružový príbeh

Serials 
 2000 - Pra pra pra
Tele-Tele
Mr.GS

Improvisational show 
 2011,  2012 - Partička

References

This article includes text from the corresponding article in the Czech Wikipedia.

External links 

 in the Czech and Slovak film database

1966 births
Living people
Czech male musical theatre actors
Czech comedians
Czech male film actors
Czech male dancers
Male actors from Prague
Entertainers from Prague